The 2013 CAF Champions League Final was the final of the 2013 CAF Champions League, the 49th edition of Africa's premier club football tournament organized by the Confederation of African Football (CAF), and the 17th edition under the current CAF Champions League format.

The final was contested in two-legged home-and-away format between Orlando Pirates of South Africa and Al-Ahly of Egypt. The first leg was hosted by Orlando Pirates at the Orlando Stadium in Johannesburg on 2 November 2013, while the second leg was hosted by Al-Ahly at the Osman Ahmed Osman Stadium in Cairo on 10 November 2013. The winner earned the right to represent the CAF at the 2013 FIFA Club World Cup, entering at the quarterfinal stage, as well as play in the 2014 CAF Super Cup against the winner of the 2013 CAF Confederation Cup.

After the first leg ended in a 1–1 draw, Al-Ahly won the second leg 2–0, and were crowned African club champions for a record eighth time.

Qualified teams
In the following table, finals until 1996 were in the African Cup of Champions Club era, since 1997 were in the CAF Champions League era.

Background
Al-Ahly were the defending champions, and also the most successful club in the African Champions Cup/CAF Champions League, reaching a total of nine finals, winning seven (1982, 1987, 2001, 2005, 2006, 2008, 2012) and losing two (1983, 2007).

Orlando Pirates were the only South African club to have been crowned African club champion, having won the final in 1995.

The two teams had met in the group stage, with Orlando Pirates winning in Egypt 3–0, then earning a goalless draw at home on the last matchday against an already-qualified Al-Ahly to clinch a spot in the semifinals.

Venues

Orlando Stadium

Orlando Stadium is a multi-purpose stadium, in Soweto, a suburb of Johannesburg, in Gauteng province in South Africa. It is home venue for Orlando Pirates Football Club.

It is currently used mostly for football matches, as the home stadium of Orlando Pirates FC of the Premier Soccer League, and was intended to be utilized, as a training field, for teams participating in the 2010 FIFA World Cup after it was completely rebuilt and reopened on 22 November 2008. In addition to the stadium capacity of 36,761 people, there is an auditorium for 200 people, 120 hospitality suites, a gymnasium and a conference centre.

The stadium was originally built for the Johannesburg Bantu Football Association and it had a seating capacity of 24,000 and cost £37,500 to construct. It was opened by the Minister for Bantu development, MC de Wet Nel, and Ian Maltz who was then Mayor of Johannesburg on 2 May 1959.

Although intended for football the stadium has been used for concerts by the Jazz musicians Molombo and by the O'Jays. Boxing matches were also staged including the 1975 victory of Elijah ‘Tap Tap' Makhathini over the world welterweight and middleweight champion Emile Griffith.

Osman Ahmed Osman Stadium

Osman Ahmed Osman Stadium, also known as the Arab Contractors Stadium or Al Mokawloon Al Arab Stadium, is a multi-use stadium in Cairo, Egypt. It is currently used mostly for football matches. It is the home stadium of Al Mokawloon Al Arab.

The stadium has a capacity of 35,000 spectators.

In fact, Al Ahly’s management decided to play the match in this stadium because the El Gouna Stadium in which it played its previous matches was not eligible to host the Champions League final, in addition to the Egyptian authorities ’decision not to play the game in the Cairo International Stadium due to the Port Said Stadium riot.

Road to final

Note: In all results below, the score of the finalist is given first.

Format
The final was played on a home-and-away two-legged basis. If the sides were level on aggregate after the second leg, the away goals rule was applied, and if still level, the tie proceeded directly to a penalty shoot-out (no extra time was played).

Matches

First leg

Second leg

References

External links

2013
Final
Orlando Pirates F.C. matches
Al Ahly SC matches